German submarine U-140 was a Type IID U-boat of Nazi Germany's Kriegsmarine during World War II. She carried out three combat patrol. Built at the Kiel shipyards during 1939 and 1940, as a Type IID U-boat, she was too small for major operational work in the Atlantic Ocean, which was now required by the Kriegsmarine as the Battle of the Atlantic expanded.

Design
German Type IID submarines were enlarged versions of the original Type IIs. U-140 had a displacement of  when at the surface and  while submerged. She had two shafts and two  propellers.

U-140 was fitted with three  torpedo tubes at the bow, five torpedoes or up to twelve Type A torpedo mines, and a  anti-aircraft gun. The boat had a complement of 25.

War patrol
U-140 carried out three raiding patrols, first under her first captain, Hans-Peter Hinsch. He took her round the north of Scotland in December 1940 following her work-up program, and it was here that she sank her first victim, twelve days into the voyage. Six days later north of Ireland, on 8 December she sank the steel 3-mast barque Penang of neutral Finland, inbound from Stenhouse Bay, South Australia to Cobh in neutral Ireland with a cargo of grain. U-140 sank Ashcrest with the loss of the entire crew of 37.

She then headed home towards retirement. U-140 was docked, her crew transferred and she was converted into a training boat, designed to operate solely in the Baltic Sea, training submariners for the main U-boat force.

Training boat
It was during this onerous yet necessary duty that her new captain, Hans-Jürgen Hellriegel, found himself facing a small Soviet submarine on the surface, well into the Baltic, a month after the invasion of the Soviet Union. In a careful attack, U-140 torpedoed and sank her rival with his scratch crew of new recruits. Orders had been pushing U-140 further into the Baltic during the preceding months, with the hope that she might achieve just such a victory.

Following this excitement, U-140 returned to training duties, which she continued for the remainder of the war without further incident, save in the final months, when she was transferred to Wilhelmshaven in a general shipment of equipment and personnel to the West. It was there, on the 5 May 1945 in Jade Bay, that U-140 was scuttled by her crew to prevent her seizure by the advancing British forces. Post-war she was raised and scrapped.

Summary of raiding history

References

Notes

Citations

Bibliography

External links

1940 ships
German Type II submarines
Ships built in Kiel
U-boats commissioned in 1940
World War II submarines of Germany
Operation Regenbogen (U-boat)
Maritime incidents in May 1945